Thomas Mustin, known by his stage name Mustii, is a Belgian actor and singer who released the albums 21st Century Boy and The Darkest Night. He is a judge on Drag Race Belgique.

Career 
Mustin finished his studies in the theater at the Institut des Arts de Diffusion (Louvain-la-Neuve) in 2012 and began to shoot for a French television series named, À tort ou à raison, directed by Alain Brunard. He also performed on stage as a character from Romeo and Juliet, named Benvolio, which is directed by Yves Beaunesne. The play notably opened the new Théâtre de Liège.

He then embarked on the staging of the play Débris by Dennis Kelly, performed in November and December 2014 at the Riches-Claires in Brussels.

In early 2015, he took part in the revival of the show L'Auberge du Cheval-Blanc, directed by Dominique Serron at the Palais des Beaux-Arts in Charleroi and the Royal Opera of Wallonia. He then starred in two films and a television series. In the first film, he played alongside Romain Duris and Gustave Kervern in the French film, Odd Job (2016), directed by Pascal Chaumeil. In the second film, he starred alongside Fabrizio Rongione in Les Survivors, directed by Luc Jabon. In the television series, The Break (directed by Matthieu Donck), he plays the role of Kevin. The series was a great success in Belgium.

In 2014, Mustin signed a contract with Kid Noize's label, Black Gizah Record. His first single, "The Golden Age", was quickly broadcast on many Belgian radio stations in Flanders and Wallonia.

In December 2016, he was nominated six times at the D6bels Music Awards in the following categories: Male Solo Artist, Concert, Pure FM Artist/Group, Revelation, Music Video, and Songwriter. He leaves with the trophy for Revelation of the Year.

On February 2, 2019, he received the Magritte Award for Most Promising Actor for the film The Royal Exchange.

Discography

Studio albums

Extended plays

Singles

References

External links 
 

Living people
Belgian male film actors
Belgian male singers
Belgian male stage actors
Belgian male television actors
Belgian pop singers
Drag Race Belgique
1990 births